The 2008 Cupa României Final was the 70 final of Romania's most prestigious cup competition. The final was played at the Stadionul Ceahlăul in Piatra Neamţ on 10 May 2008 and was contested between Liga I sides CFR Cluj and Unirea Urziceni. The cup was won by CFR Cluj who also won the Liga I title that year.

Route to the final

Match details

References

External links
 Official site 

2007–08 in Romanian football
2007-08
CFR Cluj matches